The name USS K-2 may refer to the following ships of the United States Navy:

 , a K-class submarine, originally named Cachalot
 , a Barracuda-class  submarine, later renamed 

United States Navy ship names